During the 1988–89 English football season, Queens Park Rangers competed in the First Division for the sixth year running.

Season summary
QPR dropped from their fifth-place finish the previous season to ninth in the First Division. Jim Smith resigned as their manager in December 1988, to take over as manager of Newcastle United, and was replaced by the former England international Trevor Francis as player-manager. The team's league form improved in the new year, and they lost just two of their last fifteen league matches. They reached the fifth round of the League Cup but were knocked out of the FA Cup in the third round.

League table

Results
Queens Park Rangers' score comes first

Football League First Division

FA Cup

League Cup

Squad
Squad at end of season

Left club during season

References

Queens Park Rangers F.C. seasons
Queens Park Rangers